Allan Cathcart Durborow Jr. (November 10, 1857 – March 10, 1908) was a U.S. Representative from Illinois.

Born in Philadelphia, Pennsylvania, Durborow moved to Indiana in 1862 with his parents, who settled in Williamsport. He attended public schools. He entered Wabash College, Crawfordsville, Indiana, in the fall of 1872. He graduated from Indiana University Bloomington in 1877. After residing in Indianapolis, he moved to Chicago, Illinois in 1880 and in 1887 became business manager of the Western Electrician, a trade magazine.

Durborow was elected as a Democrat to the Fifty-second and Fifty-third Congresses (March 4, 1891 – March 3, 1895). He was not a candidate for renomination in 1894. He engaged in the insurance business. He was an unsuccessful candidate for election in 1902 to the Fifty-eighth Congress. He died in Chicago, and was interred in Graceland Cemetery.

References

1857 births
1908 deaths
Politicians from Philadelphia
Indiana University Bloomington alumni
Politicians from Chicago
Burials at Graceland Cemetery (Chicago)
Democratic Party members of the United States House of Representatives from Illinois
People from Williamsport, Indiana
19th-century American politicians